Shaun Campbell may refer to:

 Shaun Campbell (James Bond), a character from On Her Majesty's Secret Service
 Shaun Campbell (editor) of FlightPathTV

See also
Shawn Campbell (disambiguation)
Sean Campbell (disambiguation)